The 2018–19 season was Ayr United’s 109th season of competitive football and their first season back in the Scottish Championship following their promotion from League One in the 2017–18 season. Ayr also competed in the League Cup, Scottish Cup and the Challenge Cup.

Summary

Season
In their first season back in the second–tier of Scottish football, Ayr United finished in fourth place and qualified for the Premiership play-offs, losing to Inverness CT in the quarter-final.

Results and fixtures

Scottish Championship

Premiership Play–Off

Scottish League Cup

Knockout round

Scottish Challenge Cup

Scottish Cup

Squad statistics

Appearances

|}

Team statistics

League table

Division summary

League Cup table

Transfers

Players in

Players out

References 

Ayr United F.C. seasons
Ayr